Immutable is the ninth studio album by Swedish extreme metal band Meshuggah. It was released on 1 April 2022 via Atomic Fire Records, making it the band's first studio album to not be released through Nuclear Blast.

Background
Guitarist Mårten Hagström stated “The title Immutable fits perfectly for where we are as a band,” “We’re older now. Most of us are in our 50s now, and we’ve settled into who we are. Even though we’ve been experimenting all along, I also think we’ve been the same since day one.”

He continued: “The way we approach things and why we still make new albums, and why we still sound the way we do, it’s immutable. Humanity is immutable, too. We commit the same mistakes over and over. And we are immutable. We do what we do, and we don’t change.”

In addition, certain Meshuggah songs on Spotify leaked a URL, which was https://immutable.se/. Clicking the link would give you a teaser of the song "Ligature Marks" and the release date

The songs "The Abysmal Eye", "Light the Shortening Fuse" and "I Am That Thirst" were published as singles before the album release. Music videos were released for "The Abysmal Eye" and "Broken Cog".

Reception

Immutable has received universal acclaim from critics with a score 83 out of 100 on Metacritic. Thom Jurek of AllMusic wrote: "Ultimately, Immutable delivers the very essence of Meshuggah. While comfortable in their collective skin, they continue expanding their reach by obliterating – hell, nearly swallowing – metal's genre boundaries in their long, relentless search for the undiscovered."

Accolades

Track listing

Personnel

Meshuggah 
 Jens Kidman – vocals
 Fredrik Thordendal – lead guitar on 2, 6, 8, 11
 Mårten Hagström – rhythm guitar, backing vocals on 11, whispers on 1.
 Dick Lövgren – bass
 Tomas Haake – drums, spoken word on 11

Production
 Rickard Bengtsson and Staffan Karlsson – mixing
 Vlado Meller – mastering
 Luminokaya – artwork

Charts

References

2022 albums
Meshuggah albums